Nahuel Salis (born 6 August 1989) is an Argentine field hockey player who plays as a midfielder or forward for Belgian club Royal Daring and the Argentine national team.

He competed in the 2020 Summer Olympics.

Club career
Salis played for Mitre in Argentina before moving to Europe to play for Leuven in Belgium for one season. In 2017 he returned to Belgium to play for Gantoise. The season prior to the 2020 Olympics he moved to another Belgian club Royal Daring.

References

External links

1989 births
Living people
Male field hockey midfielders
Male field hockey forwards
Field hockey players at the 2020 Summer Olympics
Argentine male field hockey players
Olympic field hockey players of Argentina
KHC Leuven players
Men's Belgian Hockey League players
La Gantoise HC players
People from San Martín, Buenos Aires
Field hockey players from Buenos Aires
Royal Daring players